Guido Werdnig (Ratschach, 20 June 1844 – 26 April 1919) was an Austrian neurologist.

Werdnig, together with Johann Hoffmann of the University of Heidelberg, were the first doctors to describe Werdnig–Hoffmann disease, now known as spinal muscular atrophy type 1.

References

Austrian neurologists
1844 births
1919 deaths
Spinal muscular atrophy